Charles Compton, 1st Marquess of Northampton (24 March 1760 – 24 May 1828), known as Lord Compton from 1763 to 1796 and as the 9th Earl of Northampton from 1796 to 1812, was a British peer and politician.

Early life
Northampton was the son of Spencer Compton, 8th Earl of Northampton, and his wife Jane (née Lawton). He was educated at Westminster, Ealing School and Trinity College, Cambridge (1776–1779).

Career
On 18 February 1793, he was appointed a deputy lieutenant of Northamptonshire by his father. He was elected to the House of Commons for Northampton in 1784, a seat he held until 7 April 1796, when he succeeded his father in the earldom and entered the House of Lords. His cousin Spencer Perceval, later Prime Minister, replaced him as Member of Parliament for Northampton. Lord Northampton also served as Lord Lieutenant of Northamptonshire. In 1812, he was created Baron Wilmington, of Wilmington in the County of Sussex, Earl Compton, of Compton in the County of Warwick, and Marquess of Northampton.

Personal life
Lord Northampton married Maria, daughter of Joshua Smith of Erlestoke, Wiltshire, on 18 August 1787. He died in May 1828, aged 68, at Dresden and was buried at Castle Ashby, one of the family seats. He was succeeded in his titles by his son Spencer. Lady Northampton died in 1843.

Notes

References
Kidd, Charles, Williamson, David (editors). Debrett's Peerage and Baronetage (1990 edition). New York: St Martin's Press, 1990, 

1760 births
1828 deaths
British MPs 1784–1790
British MPs 1790–1796
Charles
Deputy Lieutenants of Northamptonshire
Lord-Lieutenants of Northamptonshire
Marquesses of Northampton (1812 creation)
Compton, Charles Compton, Lord
Alumni of Trinity College, Cambridge